Gildeskål Church is a parish church of the Church of Norway in Gildeskål Municipality in Nordland county, Norway. It is located just north of the village of Inndyr. It is the main church for the Gildeskål parish which is part of the Bodø domprosti (deanery) in the Diocese of Sør-Hålogaland. The orange-colored, wooden, neo-gothic church was built in a long church style in 1881 using plans drawn up by the architect Carl J. Bergstrøm. The church seats about 750 people.

History

In 1851, a new law was passed that said that all rural churches had to be able to fit at least 30% of the parish members in the church building. Since the Old Gildeskål Church was too small, a new church had to be built for the parish. The new church was completed in 1881 and it seated about 750 people.

See also
List of churches in Sør-Hålogaland

References

Gildeskål
Churches in Nordland
Wooden churches in Norway
19th-century Church of Norway church buildings
Churches completed in 1881
1881 establishments in Norway
Long churches in Norway